Spatuloricaria gymnogaster is a species of catfish in the family Loricariidae. It is native to South America, where it occurs in the upper Magdalena River basin in Colombia.

References 

Loricariini
Fish described in 1912
Catfish of South America
Fish of Colombia